Sabertooth or sabretooth fish are small, fierce-looking deep-sea aulopiform fish comprising the family Evermannellidae. The family is small, with just eight species in three genera represented; they are distributed throughout tropical to subtropical waters of the Atlantic, Indian, and Pacific Oceans.

These fishes are named for their oversized, recurved palatine teeth, similar to those of saber-toothed cats (and the prehistoric Enchodus). The family is named Evermannellidae after Barton Warren Evermann, noted ichthyologist, naturalist and director of the California Academy of Sciences.

Description 
Sabertooth fishes have moderately elongated and compressed bodies which lack normal scales. The head is large and blunt; the terminal mouth is large and lined with slender palatine teeth, and the front is mostly enlarged and is curved inward slightly. A number of shorter, straighter teeth accompany these fang-like teeth. The tongue is toothless. The eyes range in size from small to large; they are tubular in structure and point upwards. The lateral line runs uninterrupted. The different families have 44–54 vertebrae, with three discrete bands of muscle tissue (epaxial, mid-lateral, and hypaxial) present in the caudal region. Sabertooths do not have swim bladders, and the stomach is highly distensible.

A single high dorsal fin (with 10–13 rays) originates slightly before the thoracic pelvic fins. The anal fin (26–37 rays) is the largest of the fins, and runs along the posterior half of the fish, tapering in height towards the emarginated caudal fin. A small adipose fin is also present. The pectoral fins (11–13 rays) are positioned rather low on the body. All fins are spineless and lightly pigmented in shades of brown.

Sabertooth fish are usually a drab, light to dark brown when preserved; however, a brassy green iridescence is seen on the flanks, cheeks, and ocular region of well-preserved specimens. The naked skin is easily torn. The Atlantic sabertooth (Coccorella Atlantica) is the largest species, at up to 18.5 cm standard length.

Life history 
Almost nothing is known of the biology and ecology of evermannellids. They are active, visual predators and confine themselves to the mesopelagic zone, about 200–1,000 m down; they are most commonly trawled from between 200 and 400 m. At these depths,
extremely little light is available; the view from below is like the sky at twilight. The sabertooth fish use their telescopic, upward-pointing eyes— which are thus adapted for improved terminal vision at the expense of lateral vision— to pick out squid, cuttlefish, and smaller fish silhouetted against the gloom above them.

Their distensible stomachs allow sabertooth fish to swallow prey larger than themselves; their recurved teeth likely function in a manner similar to a snake's, preventing a captured fish from backing out and helping to guide the fish down the sabertooth's pharynx. Sabertooth fish are solitary animals; it is not known whether they undergo diel vertical migrations.

Their reproductive habits are poorly studied; they are assumed to be nonguarding, pelagic spawners. True synchronous hermaphroditism with external fertilization is known in Evermannella indica and Odontostomops normalops, and the former species appears to spawn throughout the year. Sabertooth fish larvae are planktonic and have long snouts and oblong eyes before metamorphosis. Both larvae and juveniles remain at shallower depths of 50–100 m, descending to deeper water with age.

See also
Saber-toothed salmon

References 
 
 Fishes: An introduction to ichthyology. Peter  B. Moyle and Joseph J. Cech, Jr; p. 336. Printed in 2004. Prentice-Hall, Inc; Upper Saddle River, NJ. 

Evermannellidae